Morskranes is a village on the west coast of the Faroese island of Eysturoy in the Sjóvar Municipality. The 2013 population was 28. Its postal code is FO 496.

Morskranes can translate roughly as "Moors of the Corner".

External links
 Personal Danish site with photographs of Morskranes

See also
 List of towns in the Faroe Islands

Populated places in the Faroe Islands